The Bayer designation ι Fornacis (Iota Fornacis, ι For) is shared by two stars in the constellation Fornax:
ι1 Fornacis
ι2 Fornacis

Fornacis, Iota
Fornax (constellation)